Mąkolno  is a village in the administrative district of Gmina Złoty Stok, within Ząbkowice Śląskie County, Lower Silesian Voivodeship, in south-western Poland, close to the Czech border. Prior to 1945 it was in Germany.

The village has a population of 590 and since 1692 been producing black powder.

References

Villages in Ząbkowice Śląskie County